The George Mason Patriots baseball team is an intercollegiate baseball team representing George Mason University in NCAA Division I college baseball and has made six appearances in the NCAA Tournament.

George Mason participates as a full member of the Atlantic 10 Conference. They have won four regular season championships and two tournaments as a member of the Colonial Athletic Association.

History

Conference
1968–1981: Independent
1982–1985: Eastern College Athletic Conference
1986–2013: Colonial Athletic Association
2014–present: Atlantic 10 Conference

Head coaches

Year-by-year results

NCAA tournament
The NCAA Division I baseball tournament started in 1947.
The format of the tournament has changed through the years.

Notable players
 Justin Bour, 1B - Los Angeles Dodgers
 Shawn Camp, RP - Retired
 Mike Colangelo, OF - Retired
 Jake Kalish, RP
 Chris O'Grady, RP - Free Agent
 Chris Widger, C - Retired*
 Logan Driscoll, C - Tampa Bay Rays
 Tyler Zombro, RP - Tampa Bay Rays organization

See also
List of NCAA Division I baseball programs

References

 
Baseball teams established in 1968